Emily Harrington (born August 17, 1986) is an American professional rock climber and mountaineer. She is a five-time US National Champion in sport lead climbing, runner-up in the 2005 IFSC Climbing World Championships, and has made the female first-ascents of several  routes.

Early life 
Emily Harrington was born on August 17, 1986, in Boulder, Colorado. Her competitiveness pushed her to develop her climbing skills from an early age. She began climbing artificial walls and competed with her local gym's climbing team. From there, she became a professional sport climber and expanded into the worlds of rock and mountain climbing.

Harrington studied international affairs with an emphasis on politics in Sub-Saharan Africa at the University of Colorado at Boulder. She graduated in 2007 and joined The North Face climbing team in 2008.

Climbing career

Harrington has been the US National Champion in sport climbing five times (2004, 2005, 2006, 2008, 2009). She was also named the North American Sport Climbing Champion twice and placed second in the 2005 IFSC Climbing World Championships. In 2006, Harrington placed first at the Serre Chevalier Invitational. She won first place in 2012 at the Ouray Ice Festival. 

In 2012, Harrington was asked to join a joint expedition with The North Face and National Geographic to climb Mount Everest. The expedition marked the beginning of her mountain career.  Harrington summited Mount Everest in 2012, and Cho Oyu in 2016. Emily 

In 2014, Harrington attempted to climb Hkakabo Razi, the tallest peak in Southeast Asia. This peak had only been climbed once before and Harrington's team intended to create their own route rather than follow that of the previous expedition. Harrington made it to the final route that would reach the summit, a climb that she described as "extremely difficult" and "extremely scary." Ultimately Harrington was unable to complete the route due to her own exhaustion and because it was too advanced for her climbing skills, leading her to choose to turn back.

In November 2020, Harrington became the fourth woman (after Lynn Hill, Steph Davis, and Mayan Smith-Gobat) to free-climb the  granite wall of El Capitan (which she did via Golden Gate), in a single day. She completed the mammoth task in 21 hours, 13 minutes and 51 seconds. She was assisted on the ascent by Alex Honnold.  The year before, while practicing the El Capitan climb, an accidental 50 ft fall required her to be rescued. During the 2020 climb, Harrington slipped and fell, leaving her with a gash on her forehead. She was also the first woman to free climb Golden Gate on El Capitan in under 24 hours.
The media mistakenly reported her achievement as the "first woman" to free climb the mountain in under 24 hours, ignoring the achievements of Lynn Hill, Steph Davis, and Mayan Smith-Gobat on other routes before her; it was later corrected.

In 2021, Harrington achieved the first individual free climb of The American Way route on Pik Slesova in Kyrgyzstan. In 2022 Harrington and Adrian Ballinger were featured as part of HBO's show Edge of the Earth, in which HBO initially claimed they were "Attempting the First Free Climb Ascent of a Route on Pik Slesova in Kyrgyzstan." However, they repeated a free route previously established by the team of NiK Berry, Eric Bissel, Brent Barghan and Dave Allfrey in August 2019. The route was subsequently repeated two weeks after the first ascent. Unfortunately, this isn't the first time media outlets have misrepresented accomplishments in climbing.

Harrington has been featured in National Geographic'''s Adventure blog, Women's Adventure Magazine, Rock & Ice Magazine, Urban Climber, The North Face, The Joe Rogan Experience podcast and Outside Magazine.  Harrington has sponsorships with The North Face, La Sportiva, and Petzl.

 Ascents and expeditions 
 2012 – Summited Mount Everest with The North Face expedition led by Conrad Anker
 2013 – Summited Mount Ama Dablam
 2015 – Free climbed 'Golden Gate' on El Capitan, Yosemite (5.13b, 40 pitches) with support from Adrian Ballinger
 2016 – Speed-climbed Cho Oyu with Adrian Ballinger
 2017 – Free climbed Solar Flare (5.12d) with Alex Honnold
 2020 – Free climbed El Capitan via Golden Gate in a day with Adrian Ballinger and Alex Honnold
 2021 - First individual to free climb The American Way'' route on Pik Slesova

Awards 
 US National Sport Climbing Champion x5
 North American Sport Climbing Champion x2
 2005 World Champion-Runner Up
 2006 Serre Chavalier Invitational Champion
 2012 Ouray Ice Festival Champion
 2013 Ouray Ice Festival, 3rd place finisher

Personal life 
Emily has been in a relationship with Adrian Ballinger since 2012; they were married on December 11, 2021, in Ecuador. Emily and Adrian met on a climb of Mount Everest. They live in Olympic Valley, California.

References 

1986 births
American rock climbers
American summiters of Mount Everest
Living people
People from Boulder, Colorado
People from Olympic Valley, California
IFSC Climbing World Championships medalists